Magical Death is a documentary film by anthropologist Napoleon Chagnon, that explores the role of the shaman within the Yanomamo culture, as well as the close relationship shamanism shares with politics within their society.

Chagnon and frequent collaborator Tim Asch allegedly disagreed over the content of the film, when Asch objected to its graphic depictions of the Yanomami, engaging in symbolic death and cannibalism.

The film was awarded the American Film Festival Blue Ribbon.

References

External links
 'Reviewed by Eric Almquist in American Anthropologist Vol. 77, No. 1 (Mar., 1975), p. 179'
 Reviewed on page 17 of Robert Borofsky's Yanomami: The fierce controversy and what we can learn from it
 Macho Anthropology, an article written by Juno Gregory for Salon.com that discusses the filmmakers' differences over the film.

1973 films
Yanomami in film
Anthropology documentary films
Documentary films about death
American documentary films
1970s English-language films
1970s American films